Zachary Theopolis Crockett (born December 2, 1972) is a SE Scout for the Las Vegas Raiders and former American football fullback. He was originally drafted by the Indianapolis Colts in the third round of the 1995 NFL Draft. He played college football at Florida State.

Early years
Crockett attended Ely High School in Pompano Beach, Florida and was a letterman in football. In football, he garnered All-District and All-State honors.

Professional career
Crockett played three seasons with the Colts, (1995–1997). During his rookie year he only recorded 1 rushing attempt during 16 games during the regular season. Perhaps one of his finer pro career moments came during the 1995 AFC Wildcard game, where he started in place of an injured Marshall Faulk. During this game against the San Diego Chargers, Crockett rushed for 147 yards and scored 2 touchdowns to help the Colts win their first playoff game in 24 years. During his final two seasons with the Colts, Crockett started 16 of 21 games played, accumulating a total of just 464 yards on 126 carries (3.64 YPC) and one touchdown.

After being released by the Colts, Crockett played for the Jacksonville Jaguars in 1998 playing in 12 games, and starting two of them. The next year, he was a free agent and found his true home, with the Oakland Raiders. He led Oakland in rushing touchdowns twice. In 2003, he had seven starts at the fullback position. That year, he led the Raiders with eight touchdowns. In 2001, he also led the Raiders in rushing TD's, this time with six. He had to wait a while to be the starter however, as Jon Ritchie was the main man for the Raiders until 2002.

On September 1, 2007 the Raiders released him. On October 10, 2007 signed with the Tampa Bay Buccaneers and on October 23, 2007 they released him. He was re-signed on December 12 and was released again on December 19. He was claimed off waivers by the Dallas Cowboys on the same day. After practicing some with the Cowboys and being inactive for his first game with them, he was cut on December 24, 2007.

Personal life
His brother, Henri Crockett, was also an American football player, who played for the Atlanta Falcons (1997–2001) and the Minnesota Vikings (2002–2003).

Adept at cooking, Crockett is a Gourmet chef and his favorite dish to prepare for family is Peking Duck and Lamb Chops. His favorite film is Pulp Fiction. He also enjoys traveling the world to different luxurious resorts and learning different cultures. Being an avid traveler and finally relaxing is something he is looking to do in the future, and he is a member of Omega Psi Phi fraternity.

References

External links
Tampa Bay Buccaneers bio

1972 births
Living people
People from Pompano Beach, Florida
Sportspeople from Broward County, Florida
Players of American football from Florida
American football fullbacks
Blanche Ely High School alumni
Hinds Eagles football players
Florida State Seminoles football players
Indianapolis Colts players
Jacksonville Jaguars players
Oakland Raiders players
Tampa Bay Buccaneers players
Dallas Cowboys players
Las Vegas Raiders personnel